Cricket has been the most popular sport in India, it is played almost everywhere in the country and a prominent part of the country. The Board of Control for Cricket in India (BCCI) is the governing body of Indian cricket and conduct all domestic tournaments and select the players for India national cricket team and India women's national cricket team.

Domestic competitions in India annually organised by BCCI include the Ranji Trophy, the Duleep Trophy, the Vijay Hazare Trophy, the Deodhar Trophy, the Irani Trophy and the NKP Salve Challenger Trophy. The Indian Premier League, a Twenty20 tournament where various city-based franchises compete in a style similar to American football, is one of the biggest sporting leagues and the biggest cricketing league in the world. In 2023 it launched similar league for females, the Women's Premier League (WPL).

International cricket in India does not follow a consistent pattern, unlike other cricketing teams such as England, who tour other countries during the winter and play at home during the summer. The Indian cricket team is one of the most successful cricket teams in the world, having won 2 ICC World Cups, 1 ICC World Twenty20, 2 ICC Champion's Trophies and finished runners up in the inaugural edition of the ICC World Test Championship. The 2021 ICC Men's T20 World Cup, was initially meant to be hosted by India. However, after the escalation of the COVID-19 Pandemic in India, the tournament was moved by the ICC to the United Arab Emirates. The 2023 Cricket World Cup will be hosted by India. 

Indian cricketers associati is the country's retired cricketer's union. It is recognised by BCCI, but the latter do not allow any active player to be part of it or any other players union. BCCI keep ICA's representative in its and IPL's apex council.on

Cricket is an important part of Indian culture and top players, like Sachin Tendulkar, Sourav Ganguly, Virat Kohli, MS Dhoni and Rohit Sharma often attain celebrity status and are some of the most influential figures in the country. The Indian team shares a long-standing rivalry with the Pakistani team, and India-Pakistan matches are some of the most anticipated matches in the world, and one of the most watched television broadcasts in the world.

History 
The British brought cricket to the Indian subcontinent in the early 1700s, with the first documented instance of cricket being played is in 1721. It was played and adopted by Kolis of Gujarat because they were sea pirates and outlaws who always loot the British ships so East India Company tried to manage the Kolis in cricket and been successful.

1800s to 1918 

The first ever match of first-class cricket played in India was in 1864 between Calcutta and Madras. Not many records exist from the match. 
The entire history of cricket in India and the sub-continent as a whole is based on the existence and development of the British Raj via the East India Company.

1918 to 1945 
 

India became a member of the 'elite club' joining Australia, England, South Africa, New Zealand and the West Indies in June 1932. India's first match in Lord's against England attracted a massive crowd of 24,000 people as well as the King of the United Kingdom.

1945 to 1960 

The major and defining event in the history of Indian cricket during this period was the Partition of India following full independence from the British Raj in 1947.

An early casualty of change was the Bombay Quadrangular tournament, which had been a focal point of Indian cricket for over 50 years. The new India had no place for teams based on ethnic origin. As a result, the Ranji Trophy came into its own as the national championship. The last Bombay Pentangular, as it had become, was won by the Hindus in 1945–46.

India also recorded its first Test victory in 1952, beating England by an innings in Madras.

1960 to 1970 

One team totally dominated Indian cricket in the 1960s. As part of 14 consecutive victories in the Ranji Trophy from 1958–59 to 1972–73, Bombay won the title in all ten seasons of the period under review. Among its players were Farokh Engineer, Dilip Sardesai, Bapu Nadkarni, Ramakant Desai, Baloo Gupte, Ashok Mankad and Ajit Wadekar.

In the 1961–1962 season, the Duleep Trophy was inaugurated as a zonal competition. It was named after Ranji's nephew, Kumar Shri Duleepsinhji (1905–59). With Bombay in its catchment, it is not surprising that the West Zone won six of the first nine titles.

1970 to 1985 

Bombay continued to dominate Indian domestic cricket, with only Karnataka, Delhi, and a few other teams able to mount any kind of challenge during this period.

India enjoyed two international highlights. In 1971, they won a Test series in England for the first time ever, surprisingly defeating Ray Illingworth's Ashes winners. In 1983, again in England, India were surprise winners of the 1983 Cricket World Cup under the captaincy of Kapil Dev.

During the 1970s, the Indian cricket team began to see success overseas beating New Zealand, and holding Australia, South Africa and England to a draw. The backbone of the team was the Indian spin quartet – Bishen Bedi, E. A. S. Prasanna, B. S. Chandrasekhar and Srinivas Venkataraghavan, giving rise to what would later be called the Golden Era of Indian cricket history. This decade also saw the emergence of two of India's best ever batsmen, Sunil Gavaskar and Gundappa Vishwanath responsible for the back-to-back series wins in 1971 in the West Indies and in England, under the captaincy of Ajit Wadekar.

The Indian women's team made its test debut in 1976, becoming the third nation to do so. It made its ODI debut on 1st January 1978.

1985 to 2000

Globalization 
In the late 1980s, continuous live coverage of overseas matches was broadcast by British networks. This was a major factor in shaping what was now becoming the modern game of cricket. Modern technology and the establishment of specialized television networks set a global interest for the sport. ESPN and Star Sports added cricket to part of the 24 hours of continuous live coverage that they were needed to produce. Global popularity increased among the Eastern world. Soon after a domestic league (the Indian Premier League) was established.

Several team names and spellings were altered during the 1990s when traditional Indian names were introduced to replace those that were associated with the British Raj. Most notably, Bombay became Mumbai and the venue of Calcutta became Kolkata, both where the main places where the British did all their business.

During the 1980s, India developed a more attack-focused batting line-up with talented batsmen such as Mohammad Azharuddin, Dilip Vengsarkar and Ravi Shastri prominent during this decade. Despite India's victory in the Cricket World Cup in 1983, the team performed poorly in the Test arena, including 28 consecutive Test matches without a victory. However, India won the Asia Cup in 1984 and won the World Championship of Cricket in Australia in 1985. The 1987 Cricket World Cup was held in India.

From the 1993–94 season, the Duleep Trophy was converted from a knockout competition to a league format.

21st century 

 Sachin Tendulkar was one of the key members during 1989–2013 for Team India in multiple formats.

Since 2000, the Indian team underwent major improvements with the appointment of John Wright, India's first ever foreign coach. This appointment met success internationally as India maintained their unbeaten home record against Australia in Test series after defeating them in 2001 and won the inaugural ICC World Twenty20 in 2007. India was also the first sub-continental team to win at the WACA in January 2008 against Australia.

India's victory against the Australians in 2001 marked the beginning of a dream era for the team under the captainship of Sourav Ganguly, winning Test matches in Zimbabwe, Sri Lanka, West Indies and England. India also shared a joint victory with Sri Lanka in the ICC Champions Trophy and went on to the finals in the 2003 Cricket World Cup only to be beaten by Australia.

In September 2007, India won the first ever Twenty20 World Cup held in South Africa, beating their arch-rivals Pakistan by 5 runs in a thrilling final.

India won the Cricket World Cup in 2011 under the captainship of Mahendra Singh Dhoni, the first time since 1983 (28 years) – they beat Sri Lanka in the final held in Mumbai's Wankhede Stadium.

India played its 500th Test match against New Zealand led by Kane Williamson at Kanpur from 22 - 26 September 2016. India won this match by 197 runs. This test was played under the captaincy of Virat Kohli.

Currently, they are first in the 2019-21 ICC World Test Championship with 490 points and a PCT (percentage of points) of 71.They will play their final test in the 2019-21 ICC World Test Championship (which is also the final test in the 2021 Anthony De Mello Trophy) They played in their first series of the 2020-22 ICC Cricket World Cup Super League against the Australia national cricket team winning only one match and being fined 1 point for a slow over rate having only 9 points and being seventh in the league.

Organisation of cricket in modern India

International cricket

International cricket in India generally does not follow a fixed pattern. For example, the English schedule under which the nation tours other countries during the winter and plays at home during the summer. Generally, there has recently been a tendency to play more one-day matches than Test matches. Cricket in India is managed by the Board of Control for Cricket in India (BCCI), the richest cricket board in the cricket world. The Indian national cricket team has also provided some of the greatest players to the world, the biggest example of which is Sachin Tendulkar. Indian cricket has a rich history. The Indian national team is currently ranked No. 1 in Tests, No. 2 in ODIs and at 2nd position in T20Is. India has won two World Championship cups in 1983 under the captaincy of Kapil Dev and recently won in the year 2011 under the captaincy of Mahendra Singh Dhoni, which is won after a span of 28 years. They also won the World Championship of Cricket in 1985.

First class competitions
 Ranji Trophy – It was founded as the 'Cricket Championship of India' at a meeting of the Board of Control for Cricket in India in July 1934. The first Ranji Trophy fixtures took place in the 1934–35 season. Syed Mohammed Hadi of Hyderabad was the first batsman to score a century in the tournament. The Trophy was donated by H. H. Sir Bhupendra Singh Mahinder Baha-dur, Maharajah of Patiala in memory of his late Highness Sir Ranjitsinhji Vibhaji of Nawanagar, affectionately called as Ranjitsinhji. In the main, the Ranji Trophy is composed of teams representing the states that make up India. The number of competing teams has increased over the years. Some states have more than one cricket team, e.g., Maharashtra and Gujarat. There are also teams for Railways and Services representing the armed forces. The various teams used to be grouped into zones – North, West, East, Central and South – and the initial matches were played on a league basis within the zones. The top two teams until 1991–92 and then top three teams in the subsequent years from each zone then played in a national knock-out competition. Starting with the 2002–03 season, the zonal system has been abandoned and a two-division structure has been adopted with two teams being promoted from the plate league and two relegated from the elite league. If the knockout matches are not finished, they are decided on the first-innings lead.
Duleep Trophy – Named after Duleepsinhji, the Duleep Trophy competition, which is a first-class competition, was started by the Board of Control for Cricket in India in 1961–62 with the aim of providing a greater competitive edge in domestic cricket, because apart from the knock-out stages of the Ranji Trophy, that competition proved to be highly predictable, with Bombay winning the Ranji Trophy for fifteen consecutive years. The Duleep Trophy was also meant to help the selectors to assessing form of top cricketers playing against each other. The original format had five teams, which were drawn from the five zones (i.e. North, South, East, West and central) and played each other on a knock-out basis. From the 1993–94 season, the competition has been converted to a league format.
Irani Trophy – The Irani Trophy tournament was conceived during the 1959–60 season to mark the completion of 25 years of the Ranji Trophy championship and was named after the late Z. R. Irani, who was associated with the Board of Control for Cricket in India (BCCI) from its inception in 1928, till his death in 1970 and a keen patron of the game. The first match, played between the Ranji Trophy champions and the Rest of India was played in 1959–60. For the first few years, it was played at the tail end of the season. Realising the importance of the fixture, the BCCI moved it to the beginning of the season. Since 1965–66, it has traditionally heralded the start of the new domestic season. The Irani Trophy game ranks high in popularity and importance. It is one of the few domestic matches followed with keen interest by cricket lovers in the country. Leading players take part in the game, which has often been a sort of selection trial to pick the Indian team for foreign tours.

Limited overs competitions

Deodhar Trophy – Started in 1973–74 by Board of Control for Cricket in India, it is a one-day cricket competition in Indian domestic cricket. It was formerly contested by 5 zonal teams – North zone, South zone, East zone, West zone and Central zone. From 2015–16 to 2017–18, it was contested by the winners of the Vijay Hazare Trophy, India A and India B. Starting in 2018–19 it has featured India A, India B and India C.
NKP Salve Challenger Trophy – It was started as the Challenger series by the Board of Control for Cricket in India in 1994–95 and later named as NKP Salve Challenger Trophy in 1998–99. This tournament featured 3 teams: India senior, India A and India B playing each other in a round robin format. They were later renamed India Blue, India Red and India Green respectively. The tournament featured the top 36 players from across India. It was last contested in 2013–14.
Vijay Hazare Trophy – Named after the prolific Indian cricketer Vijay Hazare, the Trophy was started in 2002–03 as an attempt to bring the limited-overs game among a greater audience. The competition involves the state (and other) teams from the Ranji Trophy battling in a 50-over format. Since its conception, Tamil Nadu and Mumbai have won the trophy the most times (5). It is also dubbed as the Premier Cup by BCCI.
BCCI Corporate Trophy – BCCI have set up a 12 team inter-corporate tournament in 2009 that involves all top Indian cricketers. The tournament involves 50-over-a-side matches with the winner picking up Rs 1 crore and the runner up getting Rs 50 lakh. It was abolished after a few years.
Vijay Merchant Trophy - Under 16 youth State wise tournament.

Twenty20 competitions

Indian Premier League – In response to the rival ICL, the BCCI started the Twenty20 competition known as the Indian Premier League (IPL), which is regarded as the brainchild of Lalit Modi. This League was launched by BCCI in 2007–08 and received widespread recognition from around the country. The players were selected via the auctions and drafted into the city-based franchises. The first IPL season was held from 18 April 2008 to 1 June 2008 where underdogs Rajasthan Royals, led by Shane Warne, won the first title at the DY Patil Stadium in Navi Mumbai Based on regional loyalties, the eight-team tournament brings a unique and popular team and player auction system hand-picking some of the best international players in the world and teaming them with Indian players, both domestic and international, in one arena. The total prize money for the IPL was $3 million. The IPL is one of the most-attended cricket leagues in the world and ranks sixth among all sports leagues. The IPL has also Americanized cricket by adding cheerleaders and creating a setting of non stop action similar to sporting events in the USA. The IPL tournament consists of 10 different city based franchises.
Syed Mushtaq Ali Trophy – After India became another member of the ICC Twenty20 and played its first international T20 against South Africa, the BCCI launched its own state structure in 2006–07 season, with 27 Ranji teams divided in 5 Zones. The final was played between Punjab and Tamil Nadu, which the latter won by 2 wickets with 2 balls remaining, thereby becoming the only ever winner of this series. In this series, Rohit Sharma also became the only ever Indian to register a T20 century for Mumbai against Gujarat. The competition was later replaced by the franchise-based IPL. Played for the first time in the 2008–09 season, this is the first of its kind zonal T20 championship and the third overall in the Indian cricket season, which would see Ranji teams divided along zonal lines into two groups with the tournament culminating in the All India T20 final between the winners of the two groups for the Syed Mushtaq Ali Trophy. It was launched after the success of the IPL and the need of the BCCI to search for more talent in the growing regions of cricket.

In Twenty20, stronger crowd participation was seen than in other forms of the game. It has been greatly acknowledged by people and has made huge profits.

Youth competitions

Vinoo Mankad Trophy – A trophy tournament for under-19, in memories of famous cricketer Vinoo Mankad.
Yagnik Trophy – A tournament for inter-college, under the university level student, named after Dr. Yagnik, Gandhian and famous figure in Saurashtra.
Cooch Behar Trophy – An inter-state U-19 4-day matches tournament.

Women's domestic competitions 
 Women's Senior One Day Trophy – Started in season 2006–07, it is the women's List-A cricket tournament. Railways women has been the most dominant team, winning 10 out of the 11 tournaments. It was played in round-robin format at zonal level and the top performing team then playing in the super league. The format was changed in season 2013–14, since then it is played in 2 tiers, with states being divided in 5 groups, 2 in elite group and 3 in plate group. Finalists in the plate group, at the end of season are promoted to the elite group and 2 bottom most performing teams in the elite group are relegated to the plate group.
 Women's Senior T20 Trophy – It is a women's Twenty20 competition. It is played between full members of BCCI. The inaugural tournament was held in the 2008–09 season. Since then it has taken place every year with 2015–16 being the 8th edition.

List of domestic cricket leagues 

 T20 Mumbai League
 Saurashtra Premier League
 Celebrity Cricket League
 Karnataka Premier League
 Tamil Nadu Premier League
 Odisha Premier League
 Rajwada Cricket League
 Indian Cricket League
 World Divyang t10
 Telangana T20 League

Facilities 

India has a plethora of international standards Cricket stadiums. The world's largest stadium, Narendra Modi Stadium, ￼ is located in India. Eden Gardens of Kolkata, the 3rd largest cricket stadium in the world, is situated in West Bengal. The domestic cricket governing bodies such as Mumbai cricket association, Maharashtra cricket association control cricket realated activities sanctioned tournaments in Mumbai and Maharashtra respectively. Each of  a domestic cricket board that administrator cricket in that state. Also, regions, cities and Union Territories (UT) such as Vidharbha, Saurashtra and (former Princely state) Vadodara, Hyderabad and UT Pondicherry, Chandigarh respectively have cricket boards. The domestic boards are affiliated to BCCI. While district cricket boards in the country are affiliated to state bords. The country has lots of private cricket academies and clubs. The worlds 3rd largest cricket arena being built in Jaipur. MRF Pace Foundation provide facilities to fast ballers.

See also

Indian cricketers association, union of retired players
List of cricket records
List of India national cricket captains
List of India Test cricketers
List of India ODI cricketers
List of India Twenty20 International cricketers
[]

References

Further reading 
 A Corner of a Foreign Field by Ramachandra Guha

 "Has Virat Kohli walked into a trap laid by the BCCI president?"  The Probe, 17 December 2021.

 
Sport in India
Lists of Indian cricket records and statistics